The 1947 United States Senate special election in Mississippi was held on November 4, 1947. John C. Stennis was elected to fill the seat vacated by the death of Theodore G. Bilbo.

This is the most recent open seat won by a Democrat in Mississippi, as Stennis and his fellow senator James Eastland would continue to be reelected until both being succeeded by Republicans.

General election

Candidates
John C. Stennis, former State Representative from Starkville
William M. Colmer, U.S. Representative from Pascagoula
Forrest B. Jackson
Paul B. Johnson Jr., son of former governor Paul B. Johnson Sr.
John E. Rankin, U.S. Representative from Lee County
L. R. Collins

Results

References 

Mississippi
United States Senate elections in Mississippi
Senate
Special elections to the 80th United States Congress
Mississippi 1947
United States Senate 1947
Mississippi